Schistochilaceae is a family of liverworts in the order  Jungermanniales.

References

External links

Jungermanniales
Liverwort families
Monogeneric plant families